Haiger station serves the town of Haiger in the Lahn-Dill-Kreis of the German state of Hesse. The first station at this point was opened 1862 when the Cologne-Minden Railway Company built the Deutz–Gießen railway, connecting Cologne-Deutz with Gießen. The station became more important when the direct connection was opened to Siegen (now considered part of the Dill line) in 1915.

Reception building

Between 1911 and 1913 a new station building was built as a “wedge station” (Keilbahnhof) between the old line (now the Heller Valley Railway) and the new line to Siegen. The architect was perhaps Ludwig Hoffmann. The station is located between the two converging railways, which are elevated, allowing the platform subways to be accessed from street level. The facade and much of the buildings themselves are designed around a central axis of symmetry. The façade is dominated by a central projection of yellow sandstone. The ensemble is composed of a mixture of classical elements and Art Nouveau. The station is situated at an altitude of 270 m above sea level. The reception building currently appears neglected and its sidings give the impression of a brownfield.

Lines
Haiger station is on the Siegen–Gießen main line (Dill line) and the Heller Valley Railway from Haiger to Betzdorf, now classified as a single track main line, which was originally part of the Deutz–Giessen line. A third line, the Haiger–Breitscheid line, is closed.

Notes

References
 

Railway stations in Hesse
Railway stations in Germany opened in 1862
Railway stations in Germany opened in 1913
Buildings and structures in Lahn-Dill-Kreis
Art Nouveau architecture in Germany